The Order of Saint Nicholas is a lay order founded in 1991 by Bishop Ignatius Ghattas, attached to the Melkite Greek Catholic Eparchy of Newton of the Melkite Greek Catholic Church in Massachusetts, United States. Its now dissolved forerunner organization, the Saint Nicholas Guild, was founded in 1980 by the bishop's predecessor, Archbishop Joseph Tawil.

Officially as an unincorporated auxiliary of the Melkite Greek Catholic Eparchy of Newton, it is a non-profit corporation under the General Laws of the Commonwealth of Massachusetts.

The Order's National Chairpeople are George Mussalli and Dr. Sherine Rabbat.

References

External links 
 Official website

Eastern Catholic orders and societies
Melkite Greek Catholic Church in the United States
Catholic ecclesiastical decorations